Glyceraldehyde 3-phosphate, also known as triose phosphate or 3-phosphoglyceraldehyde and abbreviated as G3P, GA3P, GADP, GAP, TP, GALP or PGAL, is a metabolite that occurs as an intermediate in several central pathways of all organisms. With the chemical formula H(O)CCH(OH)CH2OPO32-, this anion is a monophosphate ester of glyceraldehyde.

An intermediate in both glycolysis and gluconeogenesis

Formation
D-glyceraldehyde 3-phosphate is formed from the following three compounds in reversible reactions:

Fructose-1,6-bisphosphate (F1,6BP), catalyzed by aldolase.

   

The numbering of the carbon atoms indicates the fate of the carbons according to their position in fructose 6-phosphate.

Dihydroxyacetone phosphate (DHAP), catalyzed by triose phosphate isomerase.

1,3-bisphosphoglycerate (1,3BPG), catalyzed by glyceraldehyde 3-phosphate dehydrogenase.

As a substrate
To produce 1,3-bisphospho-D-glycerate in glycolysis.

   

D-glyceraldehyde 3-phosphate is also of some importance since this is how glycerol (as DHAP) enters the glycolytic and gluconeogenic pathways. Furthermore, it is a participant in and a product of the pentose phosphate pathway.

Interactive pathway map 
|

An intermediate in photosynthesis
During plant photosynthesis, 2 equivalents of glycerate 3-phosphate (GP; also known as 3-phosphoglycerate) are produced by the first step of the light-independent reactions when ribulose 1,5-bisphosphate (RuBP) and carbon dioxide are catalysed by the rubisco enzyme. The GP is converted to D-glyceraldehyde 3-phosphate (G3P) using the energy in ATP and the reducing power of NADPH as part of the Calvin cycle. This returns ADP, phosphate ions Pi, and NADP+ to the light-dependent reactions of photosynthesis for their continued function.
RuBP is regenerated for the Calvin cycle to continue.

G3P is generally considered the prime end-product of photosynthesis and it can be used as an immediate food nutrient, combined and rearranged to form monosaccharide sugars, such as glucose, which can be transported to other cells, or packaged for storage as insoluble polysaccharides such as starch.

Balance sheet
6 CO2 + 6 RuBP (+ energy from 12 ATP and 12 NADPH) →12 G3P (3-carbon)

10 G3P (+ energy from 6 ATP) → 6 RuBP (i.e. starting material regenerated)

2 G3P → glucose (6-carbon).

In tryptophan biosynthesis
Glyceraldehyde 3-phosphate occurs as a byproduct  in the biosynthesis pathway of tryptophan, an essential amino acid that cannot be produced by the human body.

In thiamine biosynthesis
Glyceraldehyde 3-phosphate occurs as a reactant in the biosynthesis pathway of thiamine (Vitamin B1), another substance that cannot be produced by the human body.

References

External links 

 D-Glyceraldehyde 3-phosphate and the reactions and pathways it participates in, from the KEGG PATHWAY Database
 Glyceraldehyde 3-phosphate and the reactions and pathways it participates in, from the KEGG PATHWAY Database

Photosynthesis
Organophosphates
Phosphate esters
Glycolysis